Limay, officially the Municipality of Limay, is a 1st class municipality in the province of Bataan, Philippines. According to the 2020 census, it has a population of 78,272 people.

Limay is accessible via the Bataan Provincial Expressway (N301), off Exit 45.

History
The Dominican and Franciscan friars settled in Limay by the late 1600s, using its rich limestone deposits to build churches in Orion and Balanga. The town was a Barangay of Orion. The name Limay came from the Spanish word "Lima or Lime (material)", also known as Calcium oxide, a white calcium compound used in making Cement.

In the Philippine revolution of 1898, Limay inhabitants fought for their independence. American Governor-General Francis Burton Harrison's Executive Order of January 1, 1917, created Limay as the last Bataan municipality.

In 1913, the Cadwallader-Gibson Lumber Company employed Limayans and Visayan immigrants.

During the World War II, Limay became the host to the first medical hospital of American and Filipino forces, run by the "Angels of Bataan". In Lamao, Limay, Major General Edward P. King capitulated to the Japanese forces, after the last stand of the American and Filipino forces faltered along the banks of the Alangan River.

Geography

According to the Philippine Statistics Authority, the municipality has a land area of  constituting  of the  total area of Bataan.

Climate

Barangays
Limay is politically subdivided into 12 barangays.

Demographics

In the 2020 census, Limay had a population of 78,272.

Economy 

Significant economic buildings and projects:
 Limay public market and slaughterhouse
 Bataan Limay Refinery Project, 140-megawatt power plant — P78B Petron Expansion Project.
 Limay power plant
 Port of Limay

Government

Pursuant to the local government, the political seat of the municipal government is located at the Municipal Hall. In the Spanish colonial period, the Gobernadorcillo was the Chief Executive who held office in the Presidencia. During the American rule (1898–1946), the elected Mayor and local officials, including the appointed ones held office at the Municipal Hall. The legislative and executive departments perform their functions in the Sangguniang Bayan (Session Hall) and Municipal Trial Court, respectively, and are located in the Town Hall.

Limay, Bataan's incumbent elected officials are headed by – Mayor Nelson C. David (PDP-LBN) and Vice Mayor Richie Jason David.

The Sangguniang Bayan Members are:

 Sarah David
 Cecil Gerard Roxas
 Mel Fernando
 Dennis Gochuico
 Manuel Ambrocio
 Meng-Newr Tayag
 Bart Reyes
 Edong Villaviray

They hold office at the newly constructed Batasang Bayan in Barangay Wawa, inside the Judy's Park facility along the Limay coastline.

Tourism
Limay's attractions, events, and historical landmarks include:

 263 hectares military reservation (the DND Arsenal – Government Arsenal) — Headquarters at Camp General Antonio Luna
 Mariveles Mountain Complex — mountain range stretching from Mariveles to Mount Limay (or Mount Cayapo) –  higher than Mount Samat in Pilar — and with Mount Tarak
 Judy's Park (Limay Municipal Park) — esplanade along Manila Bay with retaining walls and kiosks
 Tikip and Biga Waterfalls — t falls nestled deep in the Limay mountain range
 Saint Joseph's annual running of the bulls
 Peninsula Golf and Country Club — 18-hole golf course inside the Petron Bataan Refinery.
 Limay Sports Complex and Tennis Court
 Apo Iko Fiesta Parade — October 4
 Pagbubunyi Festival — May 4
 Limay Tanod Appreciation Day — June

1935 Saint Francis of Assisi Parish Church

The 1935 Saint Francis of Assisi Parish Church (Barangay Poblacion) (Cath.: 26,440, Titular: St. Francis of Assisi, Feast day – October 4. with former Parish Priest, Father Rosauro Guila and Guest Priest: Father Guillermo Ramo)) is under the Vicariate of Saint Michael Archangel. It belongs to the Roman Catholic Diocese of Balanga – The Vicariate of St. Peter).

Its Parish Priest is Fr. Felizardo D. Sevilla.

References

External links

[ Philippine Standard Geographic Code]

Municipalities of Bataan
Populated places on Manila Bay